The following highways are numbered 733:

Canada

Costa Rica
 National Route 733

United States